Robert is a given name (the article includes a list of people and fictional characters with the name).

Robert may also refer to:

People 

 Robert (surname)

Religious figures
 Saint Robert of Molesme (1028–1111) 
 Saint Robert of Newminster (c. 1100 – 1159) 
 Brother Robert, 13th century translator of French works into Old Norse

Nobility and royalty
 Robert I (disambiguation)
 Robert II (disambiguation)
 Robert III (disambiguation)
 Robert, 1st Earl of Gloucester (c. 1090 – 1147), or Robert Rufus, Robert de Caen, Robert Consul
 Robert of Melun (1100–1167)
 Robert the Strong (c. 830 – 866) 
 The Robertians
 Prince Robert, Duke of Chartres (1840–1910)

Other people
 Robert (singer) (Myriam Roulet, born 1964), French singer
Robert Ghanem (1942–2019), Lebanese lawyer and politician
Robert Grierson (missionary), Canadian Presbyterian missionary
Robert F. Kennedy (1925–1968), American lawyer and politician
Robert De Niro (born 1943), American actor
Robert Redford (born 1936), American actor

Places
Robert, California, U.S.
Robert, Louisiana, U.S.
Robert Island, South Shetland Islands, Antarctica
Robert Island (Paracel Islands), in the South China Sea
Robert Lake, in Québec, Canada
Le Robert, Martinique; a town of France

Other uses 
 Robert (film), a 2015 British horror film
 Robert (owarai), a Japanese comedy trio
Robert (P2P software)
Robert College, in Istanbul, Turkey

See also 

Roberts (disambiguation) 
Robertson (disambiguation) 
King Robert (disambiguation)
Prince Robert (disambiguation)
240-Robert, an American TV series 1979–1981
.257 Roberts, ammunition
Robert le diable, an opera by Meyerbeer
 Dictionnaires Le Robert, a publisher of dictionaries founded by Paul Robert
Petit Robert, a French dictionary